The Movement of Young Socialists (MJS) or simply Jeunes Socialistes is the youth organisation of the Socialist Party of Belgium.

The MJS is member of the Young European Socialists (YES) and International Union of Socialist Youth (IUSY).

References

External links 
 Official homepage of Jeunes Socialistes 

Youth wings of political parties in Belgium
Youth wings of social democratic parties